The History of the Jews in Algeria refers to the history of the Jewish community of Algeria, which dates to the 1st century CE. In the 15th century, many Spanish Jews fled to the Maghreb, including today's Algeria, following expulsion from Spain and Portugal; among them were respected Jewish scholars, including Isaac ben Sheshet (Ribash) and Simeon ben Zemah Duran (Rashbatz).

Algeria won its independence in 1962, and by the Nationality Code of 1963 denied citizenship to all non-Muslims. Algeria's Jews, most of whom had held French citizenship since 1870, left with the pied-noirs. The vast majority moved to France, and the rest moved to Israel. Those who remained resided mostly in Algiers, while some settled in Blida, Constantine, and Oran.

In the 1990s, the trials of the Algerian Civil War led most of the few remaining Jews to emigrate. In 1994, the rebel Armed Islamic Group's 1994 declaration of war on all non-Muslims in the country was a decisive event for Jews remaining in Algeria. That year, Algerian Jews abandoned their last synagogue, the Great Synagogue of Algiers.

Today, most Jews in France are of Maghrebi origin, and consequently, most of the recent immigration from France to Israel consists of Jews of North African origin.

History

Early Jewish history in Algeria

There is evidence of Jewish settlements in Algeria since at least the Roman period (Mauretania Caesariensis). Epitaphs have been found in archaeological excavations that attest to Jews in the first centuries CE. Berber lands were said to welcome Christians and Jews very early from the Roman Empire. The destruction of the Second Temple in Jerusalem by Titus in 70 CE, and thereafter by the Kitos War in 117, reinforced Jewish settlement in North Africa and the Mediterranean. Early descriptions of the Rustamid capital, Tahert, note that Jews were found there, as they would be in any other major Muslim city of North Africa. Centuries later, the letters found in the Cairo Geniza mention many Algerian Jewish families.

Muslim dominance era
In the 7th century, Jewish settlements in North Africa were reinforced by Jewish immigrants that came to North Africa after fleeing from the persecutions of the Visigothic king Sisebut and his successors. They escaped to the Maghreb, which was at the time still part of the Byzantine Empire. It is debated whether Jews influenced the Berber population, making converts among them. In that century, Islamic armies conquered the whole Maghreb and most of the Iberian peninsula. The Jewish population was placed under Muslim domination in constant cultural exchanges with Al Andalus and the Near East.

Later many Sephardic Jews were forced to take refuge in Algeria from the persecutions in Spain of Catalonia, Valencia and Balearic Islands in 1391 and the Spanish Inquisition in 1492. Together with the Moriscos, they thronged to the ports of North Africa, and mingled with native Jewish people. In the 16th century there were large Jewish communities in places such as Oran, Bejaïa and Algiers. Jews were also present in the cities of the interior such as Tlemcen and Constantine and as far spread as Touggourt and M'zab in the south, with the permission of the Muslim authorities. Some Jews in Oran preserved Ladino language—which was a uniquely conservative dialect of Spanish—until the 19th century.

Jewish merchants did well financially in late Ottoman Algiers. The French attack on Algeria was provoked by the Dey's demands that the French government pay its large outstanding wheat debts to two Jewish merchants. Between the 16th and 17th centuries, richer Jews from Livorno in Italy started settling in Algeria. Commercial trading and exchanges between Europe and the Ottoman Empire reinforced the Jewish community. Later again in the 19th century, many Sephardic Jews from Tetouan settled in Algeria, creating new communities, particularly in Oran.

French Algeria
In 1830, the Algerian Jewish population was between 15,000 and 17,000, mostly congregated in the coastal area. Some 6,500 Jews lived in Algiers, where they made up 20% of the population; 2,000 in Oran; 3,000 in Constantine; and 1,000 in Tlemcen. After their conquest, the French government rapidly restructured the Ottoman millet system. While Muslims resisted the French occupation, some Algerian Jews aided in the conquest, serving as interpreters or suppliers.

At the time, the French government distinguished French citizens (who had national voting rights and were subject to French laws and conscription) from Jewish and Muslim "indigenous" peoples, who each were allowed to keep their own laws and courts. By 1841, the Jewish rabbinical courts (beth din), were placed under French jurisdiction, linked to the Consistoire Central of Paris. Regional Algerian courts--consistoires—were put in place, operating under French oversight.

In 1845, the French colonial government reorganized communal structure, appointing French Jews (who were of the Ashkenazi tradition) as chief rabbis for each region, with the duty "to inculcate unconditional obedience to the laws, loyalty to France, and the obligation to defend it". Such oversight was an example of the French Jews' attempt to "civilize" Jewish Algerians, as they believed their European traditions were superior to Sephardic practices.

This marked a change in the Jewish relationship with the state. They were separated from the Muslim court system, where they had previously been classified as dhimmis, or a protected minority people. As a result, Algerian Jews resisted those French Jews attempting to settle in Algeria; in some cases, there was rioting, in others the local Jews refused to allow French Jewish burials in Algerian Jews' cemeteries. In 1865, the Senatus-Consulte liberalized rules of citizenship, to allow Jewish and Muslim "indigenous" peoples in Algeria to become French citizens if they requested it. Few did so, however, because French citizenship required renouncing certain traditional mores. The Algerians considered that a kind of apostasy.

The French government granted the Jews, who by then numbered some 33,000, French citizenship in 1870 under the décret Crémieux, while maintaining an inferior status for Muslims who, though technically French nationals, were required to apply for French citizenship and undergo a naturalization process. For this reason, they are sometimes incorrectly categorized as pieds-noirs. The decision to extend citizenship to Algerian Jews was a result of pressures from prominent members of the liberal, intellectual French Jewish community, which considered the North African Jews to be "backward" and wanted to bring them into modernity.

Within a generation, despite initial resistance, most Algerian Jews came to speak French rather than Arabic or Ladino, and they embraced many aspects of French culture. In embracing "Frenchness," the Algerian Jews joined the colonizers, although they were still considered "other" to the French. Although some took on more typically European occupations, "the majority of Jews were poor artisans and shopkeepers catering to a Muslim clientele." Moreover, conflicts between Sephardic Jewish religious law and French law produced contention within the community. They resisted changes related to domestic issues, such as marriage.

After the 1882 conquest of the Mzab, the French government in Algeria categorized the Southern Algerian Jews, like the Muslims, as “indigènes”, and thus they were subject to restricted and decreased rights compared to their Northern Jewish counterparts, who were still French citizens under the Crémieux Decree of 1870. In 1881, there were only about 30,000 Mozabite Jews in Southern Algeria. They established, in Southern Algeria, “local civil status” laws, with rabbis overseeing legal issues. The French government recognized Jewish laws pertaining to domestic issues, such as marriage and inheritance. While these laws allowed for Jews to be structured under Rabbinic law, it prevented Southern Jews from accessing “elite” opportunities, as their indigenous status established them as lesser citizens.

French anti-Semitism set down strong roots among the expatriate French community in Algeria, where every municipal council was controlled by anti-Semites, and newspapers were rife with xenophobic attacks on the local Jewish communities. In Algiers when Émile Zola was brought to trial for his defense in an 1898 open letter, J'Accuse…!, of Alfred Dreyfus, over 158 Jewish owned shops were looted and burned and two Jews were killed, while the army stood by and refused to intervene.

Under French rule, some Muslim anti-Jewish riots still occurred, as in 1897 in Oran.

In 1931, Jews made up less than 2% of Algeria's total population. This population was more represented in the largest cities: Algiers, Constantine and Oran, which each had Jewish populations of over 7%. Many smaller cities such as Blida, Tlemcen and Setif also had small Jewish populations. By the mid-thirties, François de La Rocque's extremist Croix-de-Feu and, later, the French Social Party movements in Algeria proved active in trying to turn Muslims against Algerian Jews by publishing tracts in Arabic, and were responsible for inciting the 1934 Constantine Pogrom, in which 25 Jews were killed and some 200 stores were pillaged.

Holocaust in Algeria, under the Vichy regime

One of the first moves of the pro-German Vichy regime was to revoke the effects of the Crémieux Decree, on October 7, 1940, thereby abolishing French citizenship for Algerian Jews, affecting some 110,000 Algerians. Under Vichy rule in Algeria, even Karaites and Jews who had converted to another religion were subject to anti-semitic laws, known collectively as Statut des Juifs. The Vichy regime's laws ensured that Jews were forbidden from holding public office or other governmental positions, as well as from holding jobs in industries such as insurance and real estate. In addition, the Vichy regime set strict limitations on Jewish people working as doctors or lawyers.

The Vichy regime also limited the number of Jewish children in Algeria's public school system, and eventually terminated all Jewish enrollment in public schools. In response, Jewish professors who had been forced from their jobs set up a Jewish university in 1941, only for its forced dissolution to occur at the end of that same year. The Jewish communities of Algeria also set up a system of Jewish primary schools for children, and by 1942 some 20,000 Jewish children were enrolled in 70 elementary and 5 secondary schools all over Algeria. The Vichy government eventually created legislation allowing the government to control school curriculum, and schedules, which helped dampen efforts to educate young Jews in Algeria.

Under Admiral Darlan and General Giraud, two French officials who administered the French military in North Africa, the antisemitic legislation was applied more severely in Algeria than France itself, under the pretext that it enabled greater equality between Muslims and Jews and considered racial laws a condition sine qua non of the armistice. Under the Vichy regime in Algeria, an office called the "Special Department for the Control of the Jewish Problem" handled the execution of laws applying to Algeria's Jewish population. This was unique in French North Africa, and as such the laws covering the status of Jews were governed much more harshly in Algeria than in Morocco or Tunisia. A bureau for "Economic Aryanization" was also installed in order to eradicate the Jewish community's significance in the economy, mostly by taking control of Jewish businesses.

On March 31, 1942, the Vichy government issued a decree demanding the creation of a local Jewish government called the Union Générale des Israélites d’Algérie (UGIA). The UGIA was intended to be a body of Jews that would execute the Vichy regulations within Jewish communities, and was seen by much of the Jewish population as collaboration with the government. In response, many young Jews joined the Algerian resistance movement, which itself had been founded by Jews in 1940. On November 8, 1942, the Algerian resistance to the Vichy government took part in the takeover of Algiers in preparation for the Allied liberation of North Africa, known as "Operation Torch." Of the 377 resistance members who took Algiers, 315 were Jewish. In November 1942, Allied forces landed and took control of Algiers and the rest of Algeria. However, Jews were not returned all of their former civil rights and liberties, nor their French citizenships until 1943. This can partially be explained by the fact that Giraud himself, along with the Governor-General Marcel Peyrouton, in promulgating the cancellation of Vichy statutes on March 14, 1943, after the allies landed in North Africa, retained exceptionally the decree abolishing citizenship rights for Algerian Jews, claiming that they did not wish to incite violence between the Jewish and Muslim communities in Algiers. It was not until the arrival of Charles De Gaulle in October 1943 that Jewish Algerians finally regained their French citizenship with the reinstatement of the Crémieux Decree.

In addition to the discriminatory and antisemitic laws faced by Jews all over Algeria, some 2,000 Jews were placed in concentration camps at Bedeau and Djelfa. The camp at Bedeau, near Sidi-bel-Abbes, became a place for the concentration of Jewish Algerian soldiers, who were forced to perform hard labor. These prisoners formed the "Jewish Work Group," and worked on a Vichy plan for a trans-Saharan railroad; many died from hunger, exhaustion, disease, or beatings.

After WWII

During the Algerian War, most Algerian Jews took sides with France, out of loyalty to the Republic which had emancipated them, against the indigenous Independence movement, though they rejected that part of the official policy which proposed independence for Algeria. Some Jews did join the FLN fighting for independence, but a larger group made common cause with the OAS, secret paramilitary group.

The FLN published declarations guaranteeing a place in Algeria for Jews as an integral constituent of the Algerian people, hoping to attract their support. Algerian Muslims had assisted Jews during their trials under the Vichy régime in WW2, when their citizenship rights under the Crémieux Degree had been revoked. 

Some Algerian Jews responded positively to the call from the FLN, joining with local militias or making financial contributions. For these Jews, they recognized a common attachment to Algeria and the antisemitism prevalent among the French. For others, memories of the 1934 pogrom, and incidents of violent Muslim assault on Jews in Constantine and Batna, together with arson attacks on the Batna and Orleanville synagogues, played a role in their decisions to turn down the offer.

In 1961, with the French National Assembly Law 61-805, the Mozabite Jews, who had been excluded from the Cremieux Decree, were also given French citizenship.

Following a 1961 referendum, the 1962 Évian Accords secured Algerian independence. Some Algerian Jews had joined the Organisation armée secrète, which aimed to disrupt the process of independence with bombings and assassination attempts, targets including Charles de Gaulle and Jean-Paul Sartre. Although final appeals were made in Algeria for the Jews to remain, around 130,000 Algerian Jews chose to leave the country, and went to France. Since 1948, around 25,000 Algerian Jews have moved to Israel.

Independent Algeria
After Algeria gained its independence in 1962, it passed the Nationality Code in 1963, depriving non-Muslims of citizenship. This law extended citizenship only to those individuals whose fathers and paternal grandfathers were Muslim. 95% of the country's 140,000-strong indigenous Jewish population went into exile after the passage of the law. Approximately 130,000 Jews left Algeria. Moroccan Jews who were living in Algeria and Jews from the M'zab Valley in the Algerian Sahara, who did not have French citizenship, as well as a small number of Algerian Jews from Constantine, also emigrated to Israel at that time.

By 1969, fewer than 1,000 Jews were still living in Algeria. By 1975 the government had seized all but one of the country's synagogues and converted them to mosques or libraries. 

Since 2005, the Algerian government has attempted to reduce discrimination against the Jewish population, by establishing a Jewish association, and passing a law that recognized freedom of religion. They also allowed a relaunching of Jewish pilgrimage, to the most holy Jewish sites in North Africa. In 2014, the Minister of Religious Affairs Mohammed Eissa announced that the Algerian government would foster the reopening of Jewish synagogues. However, this never came to fruition, with Eissa stating that it was no longer the interest of Algerian Jews. In 2017, there were an estimated 50 Jews remaining in Algeria, mostly in Algiers. In 2020, there are an estimated 200 Jews in Algeria.

Traditional dress

According to the Jewish Encyclopedia,

Synagogues in Algeria

Notable Algerian Jews
 Jean-Pierre Barda, singer, actor, make up artist
 José Aboulker, member of the anti-Nazi resistance
 Alon Abutbul, an actor
 Franck Amsallem, jazz pianist and composer
 Françoise Atlan, French singer
 Yvan Attal, film director, actor (Algerian born parents)
 Jacques Attali, economist, writer
 Danny Ayalon, politician
 Jean-Pierre Bacri, actor
 Myriam Ben, activist and novelist 
 Baruj Benacerraf, immunologist, Nobel prize (1980) (Algerian Jewish mother)
 Paul Benacerraf, philosopher (Algerian Jewish mother)
 Maurice Benayoun, artist
 Jean Benguigui, actor
 Éric Benhamou, businessman, CEO of 3Com, venture capitalist, philanthropist
 Michel Benita, double bass player
 Daniel Bensaïd, philosopher and trotskyist (Jewish Algerian father)
 Richard Berry, actor
 Lili Boniche, musician
 Patrick Bruel, singer, actor
 Alain Chabat, actor
 André Chouraqui, writer
 Élie Chouraqui, French film director and scriptwriter
 Hélène Cixous, feminist writer
 Robert Cohen, boxer: World Bantamweight Champion
 Annie Cohen-Solal, academic and biographer of Jean-Paul Sartre
 Claude Cohen-Tannoudji, physicist, Nobel prize (1997)
 Jean-François Copé, (Algerian Jew mother), President of the Union for a Popular Movement (UMP) Group in the French National Assembly
 , author, wrote the first theatre play in Arabic (1847)
 Gérard Darmon, actor
 Jacques Derrida, post-structuralist philosopher
 Pascal Elbé, actor
 Jean-Pierre Elkabbach, journalist
 David Foenkinos, French born author and screenwriter.
 Eva Green, actress (mother was of Algerian Jewish descent)
 Alphonse Halimi, boxer: World Bantamweight Champion
 Roger Hanin, film actor & director
 Marlène Jobert, actress
 Judah Kalaẓ, cabalist and moralist
 Oded Kattash, Israeli basketball player, a superstar in Israel and Greece, currently head coach of Israel's national team and Panathinaikos
 Haim Korsia, Chief Rabbi of France (Algerian parents)
 Claude Lelouch, film director (Algerian Jew father)
 Bernard-Henri Lévy, philosopher
 Reinette L'Oranaise, singer
 Enrico Macias, singer
Elissa Rhaïs, novelist
 Martial Solal, jazz pianist and composer
 Benjamin Stora, historian
 Avraham Tal, Israeli singer
 Patrick Timsit, humorist, actor
 Éric Zemmour, journalist
 Claude Zidi, film director

Genetics

The largest study to date on the Jews of North Africa has been led by Gerard Lucotte et al. in 2003. Sephardi population studied is as follows: 58 Jews from Algeria, 190 from Morocco, 64 from Tunisia, 49 from the island of Djerba, 9 and 11 from Libya and Egypt, respectively, which makes 381 people. This study showed that the Jews of North Africa showed frequencies of their paternal haplotypes almost equal to those of the Lebanese and Palestinian non-Jews when compared to European non-Jews.

The Moroccan/Algerian, Djerban/Tunisian and Libyan subgroups of North African Jewry were found to demonstrate varying levels of Middle Eastern (40-42%), European (37-39%) and North African ancestry (20-21%), with Moroccan and Algerian Jews tending to be genetically closer to each other than to Djerban Jews and Libyan Jews. According to the study:"distinctive North African Jewish population clusters with proximity to other Jewish populations and variable degrees of Middle Eastern, European, and North African admixture. Two major subgroups were identified by principal component, neighbor joining tree, and identity-by-descent analysis—Moroccan/Algerian and Djerban/Libyan—that varied in their degree of European admixture. These populations showed a high degree of endogamy and were part of a larger Ashkenazi and Sephardic Jewish group. By principal component analysis, these North African groups were orthogonal to contemporary populations from North and South Morocco, Western Sahara, Tunisia, Libya, and Egypt. Thus, this study is compatible with the history of North African Jews—founding during Classical Antiquity with proselytism of local populations, followed by genetic isolation with the rise of Christianity and then Islam, and admixture following the emigration of Sephardic Jews during the Inquisition."

Population numbers

See also
 Jewish exodus from Arab lands
 Sephardic Jews
 Maghrebi Jews
 History of the Jews in Carthage

References

Sources
 Roberts, Sophie B. Sophie B. Roberts. Citizenship and Antisemitism in French Colonial Algeria, 1870-1962.] (Cambridge Cambridge University Press, 2017) .

External links
Resources > Jewish communities > Magreb The Jewish History Resource Center, Project of the Dinur Center for Research in Jewish History, The Hebrew University of Jerusalem
 
Site multilingue sur la Hazanout des Juifs de Constantine
 
Zlabia.com French site for Jews of Algerian origins
Rabbis of Algeria
Algeria Sephardim Deported from France or Executed in France during WWII (PDF)
The Jewish Community of Oran Museum of the Jewish People at Beit Hatfutsot
Documents from Old Jewish Algeria
The Jewish Population of Algeria in 1931